Detelin Dalakliev (born 19 February 1983) is a boxer from Bulgaria. He is competing in the Bantamweight (– 54 kg) division, and won the gold medal at the World Amateur Boxing Championships in Milano 2009.
 
Dalakliev won bronze medals at the 2003 World Amateur Boxing Championships and 2001 and 2004 European Amateur Boxing Championships and a silver medal at the 2006 and 2008 European Amateur Boxing Championships.

He competed at the 2004 Summer Olympics, but was knocked out in the round of 16 by Aghasi Mammadov of Azerbaijan.

He represented Bulgaria at the 2008 European Amateur Boxing Championships in Liverpool, England. At the championships Dalakliev defeated Welshman Andrew Selby in the semifinals before facing inexperienced Englishman Luke Campbell in the final.

After four rounds Bulgarian levelled the scores in the fight to 5 each after he scored a point in the last two seconds of the fight. The decision then went to countback and Campbell was awarded the title making Campbell the first Englishman to win a European amateur title since 1961.

Dalakliev competed at the 2012 Summer Olympics, once again losing to Luke Campbell, this time in the quarter-finals.

In 2020 he opened his own boxing club in his birthplace of Pleven, Bulgaria.

References

 Profile on Yahoo! Sports
 

1983 births
Living people
Boxers at the 2004 Summer Olympics
Boxers at the 2012 Summer Olympics
Olympic boxers of Bulgaria
People from Pleven
Bulgarian male boxers
AIBA World Boxing Championships medalists